The Alexandreia railway station is the railway station of Skydra in Central Macedonia, Greece. The station is located near the centre of the settlement, on the Thessaloniki–Bitola railway, and is severed by both Local and by Thessaloniki Suburban services or Proastiakos.

History
Opened 9 December 1892 as Gidas railway station in what was then the Ottoman Empire at the completion of the first section of the Société du Chemin de Fer ottoman Salonique-Monastir, a branchline of the Chemins de fer Orientaux from Thessaloniki to Bitola. During this period, Northern Greece and the southern Balkans were still under Ottoman rule, and Alexandreia was known as Gidas. In its first year of operation, the section south of the station saw 43,555 passengers, 21,564 tonnes of freight, revenue of 4,617.62 gold francs per km and expenditure of 3,123.59 gold francs per km, encouraged the line to be extended from Skydra to Bitolia in 1894. Alexandreia was annexed by Greece on 18 October 1912 during the First Balkan War. During the war, the station was used as a centre of operations for the Greek army, as it had a telegraph office. On 17 October 1925 The Greek government purchased the Greek sections of the former Salonica Monastir railway and the railway became part of the Hellenic State Railways, with the remaining section north of Florina seeded to Yugoslavia. In 1953 the station, along with the settlement, was renamed Alexandreia. During the civil war, Kouloura bridge was damaged, and as a result, passengers were transported by bus to Agra. In 1970 OSE became the legal successor to the SEK, taking over responsibilities for most of Greece's rail infrastructure. On 1 January 1971, the station and most of the Greek rail infrastructure were transferred to the Hellenic Railways Organisation S.A., a state-owned corporation. Freight traffic declined sharply when the state-imposed monopoly of OSE for the transport of agricultural products and fertilisers ended in the early 1990s. Many small stations of the network with little passenger traffic were closed down.

In 2001 the infrastructure element of OSE was created, known as GAIAOSE; it would henceforth be responsible for the maintenance of stations, bridges and other elements of the network, as well as the leasing and the sale of railway assists. In 2003, OSE launched "Proastiakos SA", as a subsidiary to serve the operation of the suburban network in the urban complex of Athens during the 2004 Olympic Games. In 2005, TrainOSE was created as a brand within OSE to concentrate on rail services and passenger interface.

Since 2007, the station is served by the Proastiakos Thessaloniki services to New Railway Station. In 2008, all Proastiakos were transferred from OSE to TrainOSE. In 2009, with the Greek debt crisis unfolding OSE's Management was forced to reduce services across the network. Timetables were cutback and routes closed as the government-run entity attempted to reduce overheads. In 2017 OSE's passenger transport sector was privatised as TrainOSE, currently a wholly owned subsidiary of Ferrovie dello Stato Italiane infrastructure, including stations, remained under the control of OSE.

Facilities
The station is still housed in the original brick-built station building. As of (2021) The station is staffed with a working ticket office. The station currently has three platforms; however, only two are currently in use. There are waiting rooms on platform one and waiting shelters on 2. Access to the platforms is via crossing the lines; however not wheelchair accessible. The platforms have shelters with seating; however, there are no Dot-matrix display departure and arrival screens or timetable poster boards on the platforms. There is also Parking in the forecourt.

Services
In 1892 trains departed daily from Thessaloniki at 06.50 and arrived at 08.00 in Kerzalar, at 08.39 in Guida, at 09.41 in Karaferia, at 10.12 in August (Naoussa) and at 10.49 in Vertekop. From there the train departed for Thessaloniki at 12.19 and arrived at 12.52 in August, at 13.28 in Karaferia, at 14.25 in Guida, on 15.04 in Kerzalar and on 16.09 in Thessaloniki.

As of 2020, the station is served on a daily basis by three InterCity trains between Thessaloniki and Florina and 18 Prostiakos terminating at Edessa. There are no Services to Bitola as the short international connection is now disused, with all international traffic being routed via Idomeni and Gevgelija.

Station Layout

See also
Railway stations in Greece
Hellenic Railways Organization
Hellenic Train
Proastiakos

External links
 Οργανισμός Σιδηροδρόμων Ελλάδος (ΟΣΕ) - GTP

References

Railway stations in Central Macedonia
Railway stations opened in 1892
Buildings and structures in Imathia